Scrobipalpula crustaria is a moth in the family Gelechiidae. It was described by Ali Saifuddin on October 21, 2003. It is found in Peru.

The wingspan is 11–13 mm. The forewings are ochreous whitish, irregularly and variably sprinkled with grey, ochreous and blackish. There are small cloudy spots of blackish sprinkles on the costa at the base and one-fourth, and a cloudy blackish dot on the fold near the base. The stigmata are rather large, black and sometimes ringed with ochreous, the plical rather obliquely before the first discal. There are sometimes indications of cloudy dots of blackish sprinkles on the costa posteriorly and termen (jin). The hindwings are light slaty grey.

References

Scrobipalpula
Moths described in 1917